Dichomeris fuscalis is a moth in the family Gelechiidae. It was described by Kyu-Tek Park and Ronald W. Hodges in 1995. It is found in China (Hong Kong) and Taiwan.

The wingspan is 16–17 mm. There is a dark brown fascia on the anterior margin of the forewings, connected with the median fascia, but separate from a small discal streak. There is a subterminal fascia, followed by a greyish-orange line. The hindwings are dark grey.

The larvae feed on Millettia nida.

References

Moths described in 1995
fuscalis